Hockey Helps the Homeless (HHTH) is a volunteer-driven charitable organization established in 1996. HHTH annually hosts Pro-am and Collegiate hockey tournaments in 15 cities across Canada where all funds raised locally will directly make an impact in their communities. HHTH's mission is to leverage Canada's affinity for hockey to raise awareness and financial support for the homeless through education, fundraising, and partnering with solutions-based local homeless support agencies. Over the past 25 years, HHTH has grown into one of the largest funders of homelessness support programs in Canada.

Notable NHL alumni and Olympians that have participated in HHTH tournaments include Mike Gartner, Megan Bozek, Shayne Corson, Daniel Sedin, Henrik Sedin, Jayna Hefford, Georges Laraque, Gary Leeman, Brad May, Caroline Ouellette, Gary Roberts, Natalie Spooner, Darcy Tucker, Todd Warriner, Wendel Clark, and Doug Gilmour.

History 
The organization, originally called Hockey for the Homeless, was established by Gary Scullion in 1996. Alongside his friends and fellow business associates, they wanted hockey to help Toronto's most needy. In the inaugural tournament, they raised just over $8,000. In 1999, Hall of Famer Mike Gartner, friends of one of the founding members, suggested the tournament be turned into a Pro-am where amateur players could play alongside NHL Alumni and Olympians, forming the structure of the current day tournaments. Mike would later become an Honorary Chair of HHTH. In September 2011, the organization changed its name from Hockey for the Homeless to Hockey Helps the Homeless to ensure clarity in its purpose.

In 2014, Canada Life became HHTH's National Founding Sponsor as well as the majority of their presenting sponsors at the local tournaments. With Canada Life's support and belief in our mission, we have been able to grant over $16 million to homeless support agencies across Canada.

Tournament Structure 
HHTH currently hosts 15 tournaments annually across Canada. Pro-am Tournament cities include Toronto, Vancouver, Montreal, Calgary, Edmonton, Kitchener-Waterloo, York Region (Markham), Barrie, Halifax, Winnipeg and London. Collegiate Tournaments include Queen's University (Kingston), and Durham College (Oshawa). Events are held between the end of October to May. As of 2019, HHTH has recorded over 20,000 donors, 3,000 players, over 1,000 volunteers and over  300 sponsors that contribute annually.

From coast to coast, Pro-am participants receive a one-day fantasy tournament where they will play with 1-2 NHL Alumni (men's), Olympians (women's), or CWHL players (women's). Depending on the tournament, there is either a draft night a few days before or a dinner reception the day of the tournament. They also receive pro level jerseys and socks, participant gifts, and fully equipped dressing rooms. Breakfast, lunch, and dinner receptions with a Charity Impact Speaker are also provided. In November 2011, Hockey Helps the Homeless featured its first women's hockey tournament. The event was hosted in the Greater Toronto Area at the Magna Centre in Newmarket, Ontario. Said tournament involved numerous players from the Burlington Barracudas of the CWHL. Another women's tournament was hosted in Ottawa in April 2012 and featured players from the Montreal Stars and the McGill Martlets. Registered players pay a fee to participate, and with corporate sponsorship, funds raised help support charities for the homeless in the host city.

Host cities

Bay St. (Toronto) 
To date, HHTH Bay St. Tournament has raised over $2 million. In 2019, Toronto's Bay St. Tournament set a fundraising record by granting $465,000. Funds raised support Eva's Initiatives for Homeless Youth. HHTH has provided shelter and housing to young people through Eva's Safe Shelter and Essential Support program and maintain other Recreation, Health and Wellness programs, which provides youth the opportunity to engage in physical activity, sports, community events, and artistic programming to promote physical and mental well-being.

Vancouver 
HHTH Vancouver Tournament has raised over $3 million to date. Vancouver Canucks alumni that have participated in HHTH tournaments including Greg Adams, Garth Butcher, Mark Lofthouse, Gary Nylund, Moe Lemay, Larry Melnyk, Daniel Sedin, and Henrik Sedin. Funds raised support 10 organizations in the Vancouver area, which includes: Covenant House, First United, The Salvation Army, Last Door, Raincity Housing, Urban Native Youth Association (UNYA), Zero Ceiling Society, Westminster House, The Bloom Group, Lookout Housing and Health Society.

Halifax
HHTH Halifax inaugural tournament occurred on November 9, 2018. In 2019, Halifax raised for $100,000 for VETS Canada, double the amount that was raised in 2018. VETS Canada is an organization that aids and comforts Canadian veterans that are in-crisis, are at risk of becoming homeless or are homeless. Since opening, VETS Canada has helped nearly 200 veterans in-crisis in the Halifax area. New in 2020, HHTH Halifax is welcoming Adsum for Women and Children as their new tournament beneficiary, in addition to VETS Canada.

Montreal
In the 16 years of the HHTH Montreal Tournament, it has granted over $2.2 million to local homeless organizations. In 2019, HHTH Montreal set a new record, granting just under $400,000. All the funds raised support 10+ organizations in the Montreal area, including Mile End Mission, Dans la Rue, Maison Tangent, Acceuil Bonneau, Action Jeunesse de L'Ouest-de-l'ile, Chez Doris, Nazareth House/Anne's House, Welcome Hall Mission, Pas De La Rue, Refuges Des Jeunes, McGill University Faculty of Dentistry,  Auberge sud ouest, St. George's Anglican Church (Montreal), L'Avenue, Old Brewery Mission, West Island Women's Shelter. Funds have gone to meal delivery, furniture purchase for the shelters, and transportation.

York Region
HHTH York Region has raised over $1.2 million in funds as of 2020 to support three local organizations - 360 Kids, Blue Door, and Hockey with Heart. Funds raised supports these organizations with outreach programs, basic needs such as food and clothing and mental and physical health programs.

Barrie
HHTH Barrie has raised over $580,000 to date, with the funds supporting two local organizations, David Busby Street Centre and Redwood Park Communities. In 2019, proceeds from HHTH tournament helped support the operation, expansion, and maintenance of David Busby Centre's 24/7 community drop-in centre and social service programs. At Redwood Park Communities, the funds support three initiatives/projects that help support 72 families in the Barrie area.

Edmonton
In 2019, HHTH Edmonton raised $230,000 which is up from 2018 raising $175,000. Funds raised supports two organizations, Jasper Place Wellness Centre and The Mustard Seed.

London
To date, HHTH London has raised over $740,000. The funds raised supports three local organizations, Youth Opportunities Unlimited, Merrymount Family Support & Crisis Centre and Unity Project. In 2019, a new fundraising record for HHTH London was achieved with $150,000.

Winnipeg
On December 6, 2019, HHTH launched the Winnipeg tournament, the home of our National Founding Sponsor, Canada Life. In their inaugural event, HHTH Winnipeg granted $105,000 for three local organizations: RaY, Willow Place, and Red Road Lodge. Proceeds assisted in mental health and prevention programs at the beneficiaries, as well as PPE and N-95 masks during the COVID-19 pandemic.

Calgary
HHTH Calgary inaugural tournament was in 2008. Since then, HHTH Calgary has raised over $1.7 million. In 2019, a new fundraising record of $300,000 was reached. All the funds raised support local organizations in the Calgary area - YWCA Calgary, Inn from the Cold, Trellis Society for Community Impact (formerly The Boys & Girls Clubs of Calgary), and Habitat for Humanity Southern Alberta.

Waterloo Region
To date, HHTH Waterloo Region has granted over $1 million since the tournament's inaugural season in 2014. Proceeds go towards five organizations  in the Waterloo Region - YW K-W, Lutherwood, House of Friendship, Cambridge Shelter Corporation, and oneRoof Youth Services.

Peel Region
HHTH Peel Region has granted over $175,000 to date. Funds raised support two organizations in the Peel Region - Armagh and Regeneration Outreach. At Armagh, money raised from HHTH helps women living in the shelter and provides funding for program expenses to help break the cycle of domestic violence. At Regeneration Outreach, HHTH funding is helping their Food rescue and Distribution program expand to increase food stability for families in extreme poverty.

Queen's University
HHTH Queen's University raised $35,000 in their 2020 event. Funds raised support Kingston Youth Shelter to provide funding for services for youth stability, growth, development, and working towards their goals for independent living.

Durham College
In 2019, HHTH Durham College raised $15,000 towards Durham Outlook for the Needy in Oshawa. The proceeds go directly towards serving meals 365 days a year to St. Vincent Pallotti's Kitchen.

Stay the Puck Home
During the 2020 COVID-19 global pandemic, Hockey Helps the Homeless was forced to put their pro-am tournament season on hold. HHTH teamed up with Bardown Hockey to create an exclusive, limited edition clothing line called "Stay the Puck Home" with 100% of the net proceeds helped raise emergency funds for our beneficiaries across Canada. The funding went towards a variety of COVID-19 emergency needs including personal protective equipment (PPE), additional staffing costs, sanitization, hygiene products, and programming.

The campaign raised over $75,000 and rallied the support of NHLer's, Olympians, NHL Alumni, and media personals.

References 

Charities based in Canada
Homelessness in Canada
Ice hockey in Canada